Ivan Rogač (born 18 June 1992) is a Serbian football centre back who plays for Russian club Akron Tolyatti.

Born in Kotor, Montenegro, Rogač decided to represent Serbia internationally.

References

External links
 Stats at Utakmica.rs
 

1992 births
Living people
People from Kotor
Association football defenders
Serbian footballers
Serbia youth international footballers
FK Rad players
FK Sopot players
FK BSK Borča players
FK Metalac Gornji Milanovac players
FC Volyn Lutsk players
FK Vojvodina players
OFK Beograd players
OFK Bačka players
FK Inđija players
FK Zemun players
FK Javor Ivanjica players
FC Akron Tolyatti players
Serbian First League players
Serbian SuperLiga players
Ukrainian Premier League players
Russian First League players
Serbs of Montenegro
Serbian people of Montenegrin descent
Serbian expatriate footballers
Serbian expatriate sportspeople in Ukraine
Expatriate footballers in Ukraine
Serbian expatriate sportspeople in Russia
Expatriate footballers in Russia